Mario Musa (born 6 July 1990) is a Croatian professional footballer who plays as a left-back.

Club career
Born in Zagreb, Musa started playing football at his local Zrinski from Farkaševec Samoborski. After seven years at the club, he moved to Davor Šuker's academy at Posavina Zagreb and subsequently Samobor, before joining the Dinamo Zagreb academy in 2007.

Following his youth career Musa became a part of a series of loans and transfers between Dinamo Zagreb and Lokomotiva Zagreb, playing for Lokomotiva in the Prva HNL, but going on loans from Dinamo Zagreb or joining Lokomotiva on free transfers and returning, depending on loaned player quotas between the two clubs. 

In January 2015, he returned to Dinamo Zagreb, but suffered an injury during training. He would go on to feature 17 times for the first team, scoring one goal, before being loaned on again, this time abroad, to Maccabi Haifa. He did not remain in Israel, however, but moved to Sweden, again on loan, in early 2017, signing for Hammarby Fotboll. He would go on to feature only twice for the Swedish club before returning to Croatia. Two more loan spells at Lokomotiva followed, with Zagreb pulling him back from his planned 2018–19 loan after only one month, in mid-August 2018, in need of a left-back to serve as alternate for Marin Leovac.

International career
Musa featured in the Croatian under-21 team in 2011.

References

External links
 
 

1990 births
Living people
Footballers from Zagreb
Croatian footballers
Association football fullbacks
Croatia youth international footballers
Croatia under-21 international footballers
Croatian expatriate footballers
NK Lokomotiva Zagreb players
GNK Dinamo Zagreb players
GNK Dinamo Zagreb II players
Maccabi Haifa F.C. players
Hammarby Fotboll players
NK Aluminij players
Croatian Football League players
First Football League (Croatia) players
Israeli Premier League players
Allsvenskan players
Slovenian PrvaLiga players
Expatriate footballers in Israel
Expatriate footballers in Sweden
Expatriate footballers in Slovenia
Croatian expatriate sportspeople in Israel
Croatian expatriate sportspeople in Sweden
Croatian expatriate sportspeople in Slovenia